The Open Hematology Journal is an open-access peer-reviewed medical journal covering ecology. It publishes reviews and letters in all areas of clinical, laboratory, and experimental hematology including stem cells and blood disorders.

Abstracting and indexing 
The journal is indexed in: 
 Chemical Abstracts
 EMBASE
 Scopus

References

External links 
 

Open access journals
Publications established in 2008
Bentham Open academic journals
English-language journals
Hematology journals